Rose Atoll Marine National Monument is a United States National Monument in the South Pacific Ocean, covering  and encompassing the Rose Atoll National Wildlife Refuge, which was established in 1973 with 39,066 acres (only  emergent).  The monument's marine areas are likely to also be incorporated in the Fagatele Bay National Marine Sanctuary.

It is a nesting site for rare species of petrels, shearwaters, and terns; and at the signing of the order establishing the monument, President George W. Bush noted that "the waters surrounding the atoll are the home of many rare species, including giant clams and reef sharks—as well as an unusual abundance of rose-colored corals". The wildlife refuge is managed by the United States Fish and Wildlife Service, and the wider-ranging monument waters are co-managed by the U.S. Fish and Wildlife Service and NOAA.

See also
 List of national monuments of the United States

References

External links
 Rose Atoll Marine National Monument – FWS
 Rose Atoll National Wildlife Refuge
 Rose Atoll Marine National Monument – NOAA Fisheries
 Rose Atoll National Wildlife Refuge Planning Update
 Copy of official map of National Monument designation (PDF)
 White House Press Release on Monument Designation

2009 establishments in American Samoa
National monuments in insular areas of the United States
Protected areas established in 2009
Protected areas of American Samoa